Dusky shrew may refer to one of at least three species of shrew:
 Sorex isodon, also called taiga shrew
 Sorex monticolus, also called the montane shrew
 Crocidura pullata, also called the Kashmir white-toothed shrew

Animal common name disambiguation pages